Halar (Haalaar) is a historical region of western India, located by the Gulf of Kutch coast on the northwestern area of Nawanagar, now Jamnagar, in Gujarat State, on Saurashtra peninsula, roughly corresponding to the present Jamnagar District, Devbhumi Dwarka district, Morbi District and Rajkot District.

In 1901 it had an area of 19,365km² and a population of 764,992 inhabitants.

History 
The name is derived from Jam Sri Halaji Jadeja who is supposed to be the 9th-generation grandfather of Jam Sri Rawalji Lakhaji Jadeja (who is the founder of the region and the first king to reign in the region); Halar was first established with this name by Jam Shri Rawalji Lakhaji, a Jadeja Rajput, in 1540.

During the British Raj Halar region was the western of the four prants or historical districts of Kathiawar, belonging to the Bombay Presidency, the others being Gohelwar (southeast), Jhalawar prant(north) and Sorath (southwest).

Princely States in Halar region 

At that time the region included numerous princely states belonging to the Kathiawar Agency, mostly ruled by Jadeja Rajputs.

Its salute states were :
 First Class states :
 Nawanagar, title Maharaja Jam Sahib, Hereditary salute of 15-guns (19-guns locally)
 Gondal, title Maharaja, Hereditary salute of 11-guns 
 Morvi, title Maharaja, Hereditary salute of 11-guns
 Second Class states :
 Dhrol, title Thakore Sahib, Hereditary salute of 9-guns
 Rajkot, title Thakore Sahib, Hereditary salute of 9-guns

Its major non-salute states (mostly minor, usually several village) included :
 Fourth Class states : Kotda Sangani, Malia, Virpur 
 Fifth Class states : Gavridad, Jalia Devani, Kotharia, Rajpara, Mengni, Pal
 Sixth Class states : Bhadva.
 Seventh Class states : Khirasra, Lodhika

Other non-salute state, granted no class, were :
 multiple villages, yet mostly minor except the first : DHRAFA  State (known as DHRAFA 24C , means 24 villages under Dhrafa's rule)  Amran, Kanpar Ishwaria, Mulila Deri, Satodad Vavdi, Sisang Chandli,
 single village, petty states : Bhalgam Baldhoi, Kansiali, Kotda Nayani, Makaji Meghpar, Virvao.

Bibliography

See also 
 Kathiawar Peninsula
 Ranchhodji Diwan

References 

Historical Indian regions
Regions of Gujarat